Þjófafoss ("thieves' waterfall"; also Thjofafoss) is located on the river Þjórsá on the east side of the Merkurhraun lava fields in the south of Iceland, at the southwest tip of the hill Búrfell.

Gallery

See also
 Waterfalls of Iceland
 List of waterfalls

External links
 More travel information from enjoyiceland.is
 More images of Þjófafoss at the Flickr

Waterfalls of Iceland